Jean de Suarez d'Aulan (20 November 1900 – 8 October 1944) was a French aviator, auto racer, bobsledder, businessman and soldier.

Background
The ‘de Suarez’ name originates from the Spanish aristocracy  whilst the ‘d’Aulan’ (of Aulan) name originates from the French family seat of that name which is attached to the titles of Marquis and Count.
Moran Suarez, from which the Suarez d'Aulan are directly descended, was one of forty knights who captured the city of Xores (Jerez de la Frontera), on the Moors, in 1266.

Jean d'Aulan was the son of Marquis François de Suarez d'Aulan (1864–1910) and his wife Madeleine de Geoffre de Chabrignac, and grandson of Marquis Arthur de Suarez d'Aulan (whose second wife was the American heiress Norma Christmas, of Natchez, Mississippi).

Bobsleigh career
As a bobsledder, d'Aulan won a bronze medal in the four-man event at the 1934 FIBT World Championships in Garmisch-Partenkirchen. Competing in four Winter Olympics, his best finish was fourth in the four-man event at the 1924 Winter Olympics in Chamonix.

Auto racing career
d'Aulan drove an EHP in the 1925 24 Hours of Le Mans race with René Dely, finishing 14th.

Aviation career
As an aviator, d'Aulan won rally events in Egypt in 1937 and in France in 1938.

Military career
During World War I, d'Aulan fought in the 5th battalion in the infantry, enlisting in 1918. After France fell in 1940, d'Aulan fought for the Allies as a fighter pilot as a Second Lieutenant. He was killed over (Germany) during World War II when his Republic P-47 Thunderbolt was shot down by a Messerschmitt Bf 109.

Personal life
d'Aulan married Anne Marie Yolande Kunkelmann in 1926. They had four children. Francois (10th Marquis of Aulan), Catherine (married with Claude Taittinger), Guilaine (married with Count de Poix) and Philippe.

The Marquesses d'Aulan resided during the summer at their ancestral estate, the Château d'Aulan, in the Department of Drôme, in the Southern of France, and in the winter season they occupied their elegant town residence in the fashionable precincts of Paris.

References

External links
 1936 bobsleigh two-man results
 Bobsleigh four-man world championship medalists since 1930
 1925 Le Mans 24 hour race classification
 Champagne region of France profile 
 Portrait 
 Wallenchinsky, David. (1984). "Bobsled: Four-man." In The Complete Book of the Olympics: 1896–1980. New York: Penguin Books. p. 559.

1900 births
1944 deaths
Bobsledders at the 1924 Winter Olympics
Bobsledders at the 1928 Winter Olympics
Bobsledders at the 1932 Winter Olympics
Bobsledders at the 1936 Winter Olympics
French aviators
French male bobsledders
Olympic bobsledders of France
French military personnel killed in World War II
French military personnel of World War I
French Air Force personnel of World War II
French racing drivers
24 Hours of Le Mans drivers
French World War II pilots
 French people of Spanish descent
 French people of American descent